František je děvkař (František is a Womanizer) is a Czech comedy film directed by Jan Prušinovský. It was released in 2008.

Cast
 Josef Polášek - František Soukenický
 Ela Lehotská - Eliška - František's wife
 Martin Pechlát - Viktor Outrata
 Zdena Hadrbolcová - František's mother
 Petra Nesvačilová - Natálie Holoubková
 Leoš Noha - Miloš - František's brother
 Arnošt Goldflam - Professor Perník
 Petr Čtvrtníček - Jarda Kopecký
 Barbara Trojanová - Iveta Loudová
 Marika Sarah Procházková - Peggy - Miloš' wife

External links
 

2008 films
2008 comedy films
Czech comedy films
2000s Czech-language films
2000s Czech films